Interstate 4 may refer to any of three unconnected Interstate Highways in the United States:

 Interstate 4 in Florida
 Interstate A-4 in Alaska
 Interstate H-4, a proposed highway in Hawaii

4